The Curfew is a historical tragedy by the British writer John Tobin which was first published in 1807, three years after the author's death. It was staged by Richard Brinsley Sheridan at the Theatre Royal, Drury Lane in London premiering on 19 February 1807. The cast included William Barrymore as Hugh de Tracy, John Bannister as Robert, Henry Siddons as Bertrand, William Penley as Walter, Robert William Elliston as Fitzharding, Edmund John Eyre as Philip, Jane Powell as Matilda and Maria Duncan as Florence. It appeared at the Crow Street Theatre in Dublin on 1 April the same year. It is set during the Norman era.

References

Bibliography
 Bushnell, Rebecca.A Companion to Tragedy. John Wiley & Sons, 2009.
 Greene, John C. Theatre in Dublin, 1745-1820: A Calendar of Performances, Volume 6. Lexington Books, 2011.
 Nicoll, Allardyce . A History of English Drama 1660-1900, Volume 4. Cambridge University Press, 2009.

Plays by John Tobin
1807 plays
West End plays
Historical plays
British plays